"Once Upon a Long Ago" is a song by English musician Paul McCartney, released as his fortieth single on 16 November 1987, from his compilation All the Best!, released two weeks before the single. The track was produced by Phil Ramone and mixed by George Martin, and features violin by Nigel Kennedy.

The song was originally composed for the film The Princess Bride.

Recording
Originally it was intended that this song would be a duet between McCartney and Freddie Mercury. The two had known each other only casually, as Mercury was a fan of Buddy Holly and would occasionally attend McCartney's Holly-inspired events over the years. However, they became proper friends following socializing that took place after Live Aid. McCartney, who had sympathy for Mercury due to the press stalking him for stories about his health, wrote the song with Mercury in mind. Mercury, however, was inundated with work, both solo and with Queen, and McCartney continued the project without him. McCartney's pitch, phrasing and key on the finished track are all very similar to the guide vocal demo he created for Mercury when he was attached to the project. Linda McCartney revealed that Paul was devastated by Mercury's death when she appeared alone on British TV a few days after Mercury died. The track was recorded at Hog Hill Studio on 11 and 12 March 1987 with overdubs added at Abbey Road in July. During this session, a full orchestra was overdubbed, as well as instrumental contributions by Stan Sulzmann (saxophone), Nigel Kennedy (violin), and Adrian Brett (flute).

Video
Filming for the video commenced on 16 October 1987 (The morning after the Great storm of 1987) in the Valley of Rocks, near Lynton in North Devon and concluded on 17 October. Appearing were Stan Sulzmann (Saxophone), Nigel Kennedy (Violin), Chris Whitten (Drums), Linda McCartney (Synthesizer), and Paul McCartney (Bass Guitar). Actor Fred Evans makes an appearance as Man with Broom. High winds and heavy rain precluded filming on the morning of the 16th so the crew filmed an indoor shot at Lynmouth town hall (this scene was not used in the final cut). However by late morning the weather had improved and although still windy, conditions were good enough to film at the Valley of Rocks. A local mountaineering instructor oversaw the rigging of a ladder so McCartney could safely access the top of  Castle Rock for the guitar solo scene where a two way radio in McCartney's coat was used to relay a taped recording of the song. McCartney declined the use of a safety rope but did have to ask the helicopter to not fly so close when shooting aerial footage. Nigel Kennedy was only available on the second day of filming so the video was shot out of sequence with the guitar solo and end scene shot on the first day and the band scenes shot on the second day. Castle Air of Treasure Hunt fame were tasked with carrying out the aerial filming.

Release and chart performance
The song was released in four versions: two different 12" singles feature "long" and "extended" versions (mixed by George Martin and Peter Henderson, respectively); the 7-inch single and the CD single (McCartney's first) feature an edit of the long version and a B-side from each of the two 12" singles, as well as "Back on My Feet", a b-side for all four iterations; and the album version featured on All the Best! contains an alternative ending. "Back on My Feet" was also the first released song from the songwriting collaboration between McCartney and Elvis Costello. Both 12" and CD singles also featured songs from McCartney's yet to be released cover album, Choba B CCCP.

"Once Upon a Long Ago" reached No. 10 in the United Kingdom Singles Chart. The single was not released in the United States nor included on the US version of All the Best!, although it did appear on the longer UK/Canada version. The song also appeared on the promotional album Never Stop Doing What You Love.  It was later included on The 7" Singles Box in 2022, which was the first time it had been included on any major US-released set.

Charts

Weekly charts

Year-end charts

Track listings
7-inch single (R 6170)
 "Once Upon a Long Ago" – 4:12
 "Back on My Feet" – 4:20

12" single, version one (12R 6170)
 "Once Upon a Long Ago" (Long Version) – 4:34
 "Back on My Feet" – 4:21
 "Midnight Special" – 3:56
 "Don't Get Around Much Anymore" – 2:51

12" single, version two (12RX 6170)
 "Once Upon a Long Ago" (Extended Version) – 6:06
 "Back on My Feet" – 4:21
 "Lawdy Miss Clawdy" – 3:15
 "Kansas City" – 4:00

CD single (CDR 6170)
 "Once Upon a Long Ago" – 4:12
 "Back on My Feet" – 4:21
 "Don't Get Around Much Anymore" – 2:51
 "Kansas City" – 4:00

Once Upon a Video
Along with the single and the All the Best! album there was also released an 18-minute VHS for sale called Once Upon a Video, consisting of four music videos:
 "Once Upon a Long Ago"	
 "Stranglehold"
 "Pretty Little Head"
 "We All Stand Together" – the music video was an edit of the songpart from the movie Rupert and the Frog Song

"We All Stand Together" was included on the UK/Canada-release of All the Best! along with "Once Upon a Long Ago".

Personnel
Paul McCartney – vocals, electric guitar, acoustic guitar, piano, bass, synthesizers
Linda McCartney – background vocals, tambourine
Nick Glennie-Smith – keyboards
Tim Renwick – electric guitar
Henry Spinetti – drums
George Martin – orchestration, mixing
Stan Sulzmann – saxophone
Nigel Kennedy – violin
Adrian Brett – flute

References

1987 singles
Paul McCartney songs
Song recordings produced by Phil Ramone
Songs written by Paul McCartney
Music published by MPL Music Publishing
Songs written for films